Events from the year 1874 in Ireland.

Events
17 February – United Kingdom general election in Ireland in which 59 professing members of the Home Rule League are returned.
24 May – Queen Victoria creates her third eldest son, Prince Arthur, Duke of Connaught and Strathearn, after the province of Connaught.
26 July – the Roman Catholic Cathedral of the Immaculate Conception, Sligo, is opened.

Arts and literature

Sport

Births
28 January – Kathleen Lynn, physician and politician (died 1955).
15 February – Ernest Shackleton, explorer, remembered for his Antarctic expedition of 1914–1916 in the ship Endurance (died 1922).
24 February – Con Lucid, Major League Baseball player (died 1931).
29 March – Rupert Edward Cecil Lee Guinness, 2nd Earl of Iveagh, businessman, politician and philanthropist, Chancellor University of Dublin (died 1967).
24 April – Annie Moore, migrant to the United States (died c.1924).
25 April – Guglielmo Marconi, inventor (born in Bologna of Irish maternity) (died 1937)
29 April – Conal Holmes O'Connell O'Riordan, dramatist and novelist (died 1948).
13 May – Percy Redfern Creed, soldier, sportsman and writer (died 1964).
6 June – George Harman, cricketer and rugby player (died 1975).
11 June – Arthur Gwynn, cricketer and rugby player (died 1898).
14 June – Louis Lipsett, British Army and Canadian Expeditionary Force senior officer during the First World War (killed in action 1918).
18 July – Cathal Brugha, active in Easter Rising, Irish War of Independence, and Irish Civil War and was first Ceann Comhairle of Dáil Éireann, shot by Free State troops (died 1922).
18 July – Bob Lambert, cricketer (died 1956).
20 July
Jer Doheny, Kilkenny hurler (died 1929).
Monsignor Michael J. O'Doherty, Archbishop of Manila (died 1949)
11 August – John Philip Bagwell, general manager Great Northern Railway, Seanad member (died 1946).
17 September – Bernard Forbes, 8th Earl of Granard, soldier and politician (died 1948).
11 November – Louise McIlroy, Professor of Obstetrics and Gynaecology at the London School of Medicine for Women (died 1968).
1 December – Michael Mallin, second in command of Irish Citizen Army, participant in the Easter Rising (executed by firing squad in Kilmainham Jail 1916).
18 December – Philip Meldon, cricketer (died 1942).
Full date unknown
Eamonn Duggan, lawyer, nationalist and politician (died 1936).
Patrick Hannon, Conservative and Unionist Party (UK) politician (died 1963).

Deaths
April – Biddy Early, traditional healer (born c. 1798).
26 July – Abraham Brewster, judge and Lord Chancellor of Ireland (born 1796).
27 August – John Henry Foley, sculptor (born 1818).
30 August – Michael Banim, writer (born 1796).
17 September – Edmond Burke Roche, 1st Baron Fermoy, politician (born 1815).
21 September – Arthur Jacob, ophthalmologist (born 1790).
17 October – John Benson, architect for Irish Industrial Exhibition, Great Industrial Exhibition (1853) and the 1855 Cork Opera House (born 1812).

References

 
1870s in Ireland
Ireland
Years of the 19th century in Ireland